Ilse Petri (20 March 1918 – 3 February 2018) was a German stage, television and film actress.

Partial filmography

 April, April! (1935)
 Das Mädchen vom Moorhof (1935)
 Königstiger (1935)
 The Abduction of the Sabine Women (1936) - Paula Gollwitz
 A Strange Guest (1936) - Yvette - seine Tochter
 Thunder, Lightning and Sunshine (1936) - Evi, beider Tochter
 Monika (1938) - Inge, Monika's Friend
 Women for Golden Hill (1938) - Margaret
 Bel Ami (1939) - Zofe bei Frau von Marelle
 Men Are That Way (1939) - Direktions-Sekretärin
 Hochzeit mit Hindernissen (1939) - Trude, Lehmanns Tochter
 Who's Kissing Madeleine? (1939) - Suzette
 The Girl at the Reception (1940)
 Die verzauberte Prinzessin (1940)
 Heimaterde (1941)
 Altes Herz wird wieder jung (1943) - Lotte Wendisch
 Seine beste Rolle (1944) - Hilde Röder
 The Degenhardts (1944)
 The Adventures of Fridolin (1948) - Marlen Weber - Malerin
  (1949) - Lilly Mertens, Tänzerin
 Fanfares of Love (1951) - Sabine
 Eyes of Love (1951) - Milo Thiele
 Heute nacht passiert's (1953) - Frau Evchen Bräutigam
 Fanfare of Marriage (1953) - Sabine Schmidt
 Three Days Confined to Barracks (1955) - Dienstmädchen Bertha
 The Turkish Cucumbers (1962) - Petra, seine Frau
 Aunt Frieda (1965) - Frau Waschkühn
 Zur Hölle mit den Paukern (1968) - Mrs. Nietnagel

References

Bibliography
 Goble, Alan. The Complete Index to Literary Sources in Film. Walter de Gruyter, 1999.

External links

1918 births
2018 deaths
German film actresses
German television actresses
German stage actresses
Actors from Göttingen